Vaejovidae is a family of scorpions, comprising 25 genera and 227 species, found in North America. The species of the genus are found in Mexico and the southern United States, and Paruroctonus boreus is found in Canada and is the northernmost species of scorpion in the world.

Balsateres Gonzalez-Santillan & Prendini, 2013
Catalinia Soleglad, Ayrey, Graham & Fet, 2017
Chihuahuanus Gonzalez-Santillan & Prendini, 2013
Franckeus Soleglad & Fet, 2005
Gertschius Graham & Soleglad, 2007
Graemeloweus Soleglad, Fet, Graham & Ayrey, 2016
Kochius Soleglad & Fet, 2008
Konetontli Gonzalez-Santillan & Prendini, 2013
Kovarikia Soleglad, Fet & Graham, 2014
Kuarapu Francke & Ponce-Saavedra, 2010
Maaykuyak González-Santillán & Prendini, 2013
Mesomexovis González-Santillán & Prendini, 2013
Paravaejovis Williams, 1980
Paruroctonus Werner, 1934
Pseudouroctonus Stahnke, 1974
Serradigitus Stahnke, 1974
Smeringurus Haradon, 1983
Stahnkeus Soleglad & Fet, 2006
Syntropis Kraepelin, 1900
Thorellius Soleglad & Fet, 2008
Uroctonites Williams & Savary, 1991
Vaejovis C. L. Koch, 1836
Vejovoidus Stahnke, 1974
Vizcaino Gonzalez-Santillan & Prendini, 2013
Wernerius Soleglad & Fet, 2008

References

 
Scorpion families